Portrait of a Woman is a circa 1515 oil painting by the German artist Hans Holbein the Elder. It is now in the Unterlinden Museum in Colmar, France. Its inventory number is 80.1.1. In the 19th-century, the painting used to belong to count Karol Lanckoroński, of Vienna. In 2016, it was the only painting by Holbein the Elder owned by a public collection in France.

This portrait was painted towards the end of the artist's life. The depicted woman's identity is unknown.

References

External links

Portrait of a Woman, presentation on the museum's website

Portraits by German artists
16th-century portraits
Renaissance portraits
Portraits of women
Paintings in Alsace
Portraits of women
Oil paintings